Hsiao Ho may refer to:

Xiao He (died 193 BC), Liu Bang's advisor during the Chu-Han Contention and chancellor of the Han dynasty, name also romanized as Hsiao Ho
Hsiao Ho (actor) (born 1958), Hong Kong-based Chinese actor